Jalen Pitre (born June 3, 1999) is an American football safety for the Houston Texans of the National Football League (NFL). He played college football at Baylor and in 2021, he was named the Big 12 Defensive Player of the Year and a consensus All-American.

High school career
Pitre attended Stafford High School in Stafford, Texas. He committed to Baylor University to play college football.

College career
As a true freshman at Baylor in 2017, Pitre started eight of 12 games, recording 37 tackles and one sack. As a sophomore he started one of 13 games and had 11 tackles. In 2019, he played in four games and took a redshirt. He finished the season with 12 tackles. As a redshirt junior in 2020, Pitre started all nine games, recording 60 tackles, two interceptions and two sacks. He returned as a starter in 2021 and was named a finalist for the Jim Thorpe Award.

Professional career

Houston Texans
Pitre was selected by the Houston Texans with the 37th overall pick in the second round of the 2022 NFL Draft. He recorded his first two professional interceptions in Week 3 against the Chicago Bears.

References

External links
 Houston Texans bio
Baylor Bears bio

1999 births
Living people
People from Stafford, Texas
Players of American football from Texas
Sportspeople from Harris County, Texas
American football safeties
Baylor Bears football players
All-American college football players
Houston Texans players